The 1951 Campeonato Paulista da Primeira Divisão, organized by the Federação Paulista de Futebol, was the 50th season of São Paulo's top professional football league. Corinthians won the title for the 13th time. no teams were relegated and the top scorer was Corinthians's Carbone with 30 goals.

Championship
The championship was disputed in a double-round robin system, with the team with the most points winning the title.

Results

Relegation Playoffs
The regulation stipulated that the last-placed team of the championship should dispute a best-of-four points series against the champions of the Second Level. After one win for each side in the first two matches, XV de Jaú and Jabaquara faced off in neutral ground for the third match of the series. After XV de Jaú scored the match's only goal, Jabaquara's players abandoned the pitch claiming that the goal had been irregular. This sparked a lengthy court battle that delayed the start of the championship of the next year, and ended with Jabaquara's relegation being cancelled.

Top Scores

References

Campeonato Paulista seasons
Paulista